Saor Patrol (pronounced "shore patrol", Scottish Gaelic: Freedom Patrol) is a Scottish folk, Rock band from Scotland, newly reformed and based in Europe. 

The band plays its own songs. All songs are instrumental and played with Great Highland Bagpipe, drums, Electric Guitar and other instruments.

Discography 
 Esspee, Banshee Records,
 Black Bull, Banshee Records
 Full Boar, Banshee Records
 Full Throttle, Banshee Records, 21 March 2008
 Hands across the Border, Banshee Records (also as DVD)
 The Stomp-Scottish Pipes and Drums Untamed, Banshee Records, 12 February 2010
 Duncarron, ARC Music, 2011
 Two Headed Dog (Duncarron electric), ARC Music 2012
 Die Krieger (Live), ARC Music 2013
 Open Air Asylum (Live) ARC Music 2014
 Early Years ARC Music 2014
 Outlander ARC Music 2014 - UK Album Chart #159
 Battle of Kings, ARC Music 2018
 2.0, 2022, Independent Release, Saor Patrol GbR.

External links 

 Saor Patrol website

Scottish folk musicians
British folk rock groups
Celtic music groups